Qalatuiyeh (also Romanized as Qalātū’īyeh; also known as Qalātū) is a village in Dar Agah Rural District, in the Central District of Hajjiabad County, Hormozgan Province, Iran. At the 2006 census, its population was 118, in 35 families.

References 

Populated places in Hajjiabad County